Joseph-Armand Landry (14 December 1918 – 23 March 1985) was a Liberal party member of the House of Commons of Canada. He was an accountant, insurance broker and manager by career.

Landry attempted to win the Dorchester federal riding in the 1953 election but was unsuccessful. He won Dorchester in the 1957 election and served one term, the 23rd Canadian Parliament. He was defeated by Noël Drouin of the Progressive Conservative party in 1957. Landry made one further unsuccessful attempt at winning back Dorchester in 1958.

References 

1918 births
1985 deaths
Members of the House of Commons of Canada from Quebec
Liberal Party of Canada MPs
Canadian accountants